Tecmash is a Russian arms industry company within the state-owned Rostec group producing and developing weapons, munitions, and ammunition for Armed Forces.

Subsidiaries
The structure of the holding company JSC "SPC" Tecmash "currently includes 48 organizations of industry of munitions and special chemicals, 47 companies belong to the military–industrial complex and included in the consolidated register of organizations of military-industrial complex of the Russian Federation. Many enterprises and research institutions that are included in the holding company, have a history that spans several decades. The organization of the holding company are located in 15 regions of the Russian Federation.

List of subsidiaries:

 State Research Institute Kristall
 Leningrad Mechanical Plant named after Karl Liebknecht
 The Tech Mash
 Research Institute of Engineering
 Research Institute Search
 Research Institute of Polymer Materials
 Research Institute of Machine Building
 Order of the Red Banner of Labor Special Research and Design Institute Soyuzprom NIIproekt
 Central Design Bureau of Polymer Materials with Pilot Production
 Cheboksary Production Association named after V. I. Chapaev
 Verkhneturinsky Machine Building Plant
 NPO Bazalt
 NPO Splav
 NPO Pribor
 Federal Research and Production Center Scientific Research Institute of Applied Chemistry
 Shtamp Machine-Building Plant
 Aleksinsky Experimental Mechanical Plant
 Biisk Production Association Sibpribormash
 Bryansk Chemical Plant named after the 50th anniversary of the USSR
 Plastics Plant
 Kalinin Plant
 Institute of Permgipromashprom
 Kalinovka Chemical Plant
 Kemerovo Mechanical Plant
 Red Army Research Institute of Mechanization
 Krasnozavodsky Chemical Plant
 Scientific Research Institute of Electronic Devices
 PI Snegirev Research Technological Institute
 Scientific and Production Association Device
 Delta Research and Production Enterprise
 Scientific-Production Enterprise Krasnoznamenets
 Nizhnelomovsky Electromechanical Plant
 Novo-Vyatka
 Novosibirsk Artificial Fiber Plant
 Novosibirsk Mechanical Plant Iskra
 OJSC Polymer
 Sergo Plant Production Association
 Mechanical Repair Plant Enisey
 Saratov Plant of Instrument Devices
 Smolensk Plant of Radio Components
 Solikamsk plant Ural
 Plant of Synthetic Fibers Elastic

See also

KB Tochmash

References

External links
 Official website

 
Companies established in 2011
Defence companies of Russia
Russian brands
Companies based in Moscow